Paul Ryan Grasmanis (born August 2, 1974) is a former American football defensive lineman from Jenison, Michigan of Latvian descent.  

He was a ten-year veteran of the NFL and was picked in the fourth round of the 1996 NFL Draft by the Chicago Bears.  Paul was also a standout defensive tackle during his career at the University of Notre Dame.

In 1999, he spent one week with the St. Louis Rams and was dropped and picked up by the Denver Broncos.  He signed onto the Eagles in 2000, and retired prior to the 2006 season due to his persistent injuries.

References

1974 births
Living people
American football defensive tackles
Chicago Bears players
Denver Broncos players
Notre Dame Fighting Irish football players
Philadelphia Eagles players
St. Louis Rams players
American people of Latvian descent
Players of American football from Grand Rapids, Michigan
People from Jenison, Michigan